Peter Joseph Fick (December 12, 1913 – August 10, 1980) was an American competition swimmer and former world record-holder in two events.

Fick represented the United States at the 1936 Summer Olympics in Berlin, Germany.  He was the world record-holder and pre-race favorite, but finished sixth overall in the event final of the 100-meter freestyle with a time of 59.7 seconds. In 1978 he was inducted into the International Swimming Hall of Fame.

Fick was married to actress Bess Johnson. And prior to that, Donna Damerel.

See also
 List of members of the International Swimming Hall of Fame
 World record progression 100 metres freestyle
 World record progression 4 × 100 metres freestyle relay

References

1913 births
1980 deaths
Yale Bulldogs men's swimmers
American male freestyle swimmers
World record setters in swimming
Olympic swimmers of the United States
Swimmers at the 1936 Summer Olympics